Gareth Wood (born 22 April 1995) is a British acrobatic gymnast. With partners Connor Bartlett, Daniel Cook and George Wood, Wood achieved silver in the 2014 Acrobatic Gymnastics World Championships.

In 2018, Wood also achieved bronze at the annual Aldermore 5-a-side football tournament with Lee Singh FC.

References

1995 births
Living people
British acrobatic gymnasts
Male acrobatic gymnasts
Medalists at the Acrobatic Gymnastics World Championships
21st-century British people